James Frances Fitzgerald (born 3 November 1883, date of death unknown) was a Canadian athlete.  He competed at the 1908 Summer Olympics in London. In the 1500 metres, Fitzgerald placed seventh and last in his initial semifinal heat and did not advance to the final.

References

 
 
 

1883 births
Year of death missing
Athletes (track and field) at the 1908 Summer Olympics
Canadian male middle-distance runners
Olympic track and field athletes of Canada